Coats Spring is an unincorporated community in Logan Township, Pike County, in the U.S. state of Indiana.

History
The community was named for James Coates, who started a mineral spa at Coats Spring in 1867.

A post office was established at Coats Spring in 1874, and remained in operation until it was discontinued in 1903.

Geography

References

Unincorporated communities in Pike County, Indiana
Unincorporated communities in Indiana